Wine Into Water is the sixth album by American country music singer T. Graham Brown. It was released August 25, 1998 by Intersound Records.

Critical reception

Thom Owens of AllMusic says, "Wine Into Water is one of Brown's very best albums, not only because it finds him coming to terms with his own personal demons, but because it is so well-crafted."

Kimmy Wix of CMT quotes Brown, "This is the first time I've ever got to make an album exactly like I wanted," explains T. of his new Wine Into Water album, his first release in more than seven years."

Track listing

Track information and credits verified from the album's liner notes.

Personnel
T. Graham Brown – vocals
James Pennebaker – acoustic guitar, electric guitar, pedal steel guitar
Reese Wynans – Hammond B-3 organ, Wurlitzer, piano
Chad Cromwell – drums
Kenny Greenberg – acoustic guitar, electric guitar
Michael Rhodes – bass
Delaney Bramlett – National Resophonic and tremolo guitar, harmony vocals (Track 11)
Kim Bramlett – harmony vocals (Track 11)
Beth Nielsen Chapman – harmony vocals (Track 9)
Ashley Cleveland – harmony vocals (Tracks 3, 10)
Tom Flora – harmony vocals (Tracks 2, 5, 8)
Jim Horn – saxophone (Tracks 7, 8, 10)
Carl Marsh – strings (Tracks 1, 9)
Delbert McClinton – harmonica (Track 7)
Jonell Mosser – harmony vocals (Tracks 3, 10)
Gary Nicholson – National Resophonic guitar (Track 7)
Lee Roy Parnell – guitar (Tracks 5, 10)
Al Anderson – acoustic guitar (Tracks 6, 9)
Gary Pigg – harmony vocals (Tracks 2, 5, 8)
Tom Roady – shaker (Tracks 2, 5, 10)
Marty Stuart – mandolin (Track 4)
Terry Townson – trumpet (Tracks 7, 8, 10)
Steve Wariner – harmony vocals (Track 1)
Bruce Bouton – steel (Tracks 1, 4)

Production
Gary Nicholson – Producer
T. Graham Brown – Producer
Toby Seay – Engineer
Russ Martin – Engineer
Randy LeRoy – Mastering
Justin Neibank – Mixing
Matt Andrews – Assistant Engineer
Mark Meckel – Production Assistant
Tom Bevins – Photography
Cameron Chilton – Cover Design

Charts

References

External links
T. Graham Brown Official Site

1998 albums
T. Graham Brown albums